Payao is not to be confused with the Thai town of Phayao. Payao may refer to:

 Payao, the term the locals use for the Banaue Rice Terraces
 Payao, Zamboanga Sibugay, a municipality in the Province of Zamboanga Sibugay